The Northern Counties Palatine was a step-entrance 2-axle and 3-axle double-decker bus body built by Northern Counties from 1988 to 1999 in Wigan, England.

The Palatine was built mainly on Leyland Olympian and Volvo Olympian chassis, although smaller sized orders were also built for customers on DAF DB250, Dennis Arrow, Dennis Dominator, Volvo B10M Citybus and Scania N113DRB chassis.

Northern Counties were acquired by Plaxton in 1995, who eventually discontinued the Northern Counties name and replaced the step-entrance Palatine range with the low-floor Plaxton President in 1999.

Northern Counties Palatine/Countybus

The Northern Counties Palatine was launched in 1988, initially badged as the Countybus in line with other Northern Counties bus bodies at the time.

The Palatine proved popular in London, with the biggest operators of the body type being Go-Ahead Group subsidiaries London General and London Central who purchased a total of 159 Palatines on the Volvo Olympian chassis, as well as 38 built on the Volvo Citybus chassis. Capital Citybus, and their predecessor Ensignbus, also operated Palatines, of which were built on both the Dennis Dominator and Volvo Olympian chassis.

Outside London, the Palatine proved popular with former PTE operations Yorkshire Rider, Busways Travel, Merseybus and GM Buses, who each purchased Palatines on both Leyland and Volvo Olympian chassis, as well as some on the Scania N113 chassis; two of GM Buses' Palatines were uniquely built with wheelchair lifts on the Volvo D10M chassis. The British Bus group also purchased a significant amount of Palatines on Leyland and Volvo Olympian chassis, with subsidiaries Maidstone & District, Kentish Bus, Southend Transport and West Riding Buses making up the majority of orders. Five Palatine-bodied Volvo Olympians built to Stagecoach specification were delivered to Cleveland Transit in 1994, with three more also delivered to their subsidiary Kingston upon Hull City Transport.

Badgerline Group subsidiary Bristol Cityline took on 30 Leyland Olympians with Palatine I bodies in 1992, while East Yorkshire Motor Services took on a large number Leyland and Volvo Olympians with Palatine I bodies between 1990 and 1998 to replace former National Bus Company buses. Five were also delivered to their Finglands Coachways subsidiary in Manchester. Thirteen Leyland Olympians with Palatine I bodies were delivered to Isle of Man Transport between 1989 and early 1990, while Blazefield Holdings subsidiaries Keighley & District and Yorkshire Coastliner also purchased Palatines on Volvo Olympian chassis.

Northern Counties Palatine II

The second-generation Northern Counties Palatine II was launched in 1993. Visually similar in design to its competitor, the Optare Spectra, the Palatine II had a revised front fascia which also featured a curved windscreen and a rounded roofline, sharing similar design cues with the single-decker Northern Counties Paladin; wider and deeper windows and more interior headroom. The first-generation 'Countybus' was subsequently renamed the 'Palatine' and continued to be sold alongside the Palatine II as a low-cost alternative.

MTL Trust Holdings were a notable operator, purchasing an initial batch of 36 high-specification Palatine IIs in 1996 for both the 'Silver Service' through the Mersey Tunnels and for the Southport operation. Another batch of 22, branded as 'The Millennium Fleet', entered service in Merseyside in 1998.

In London, the Palatine II proved less popular than the Palatine I. However, Capital Citybus were early adopters of the Palatine II, ordering the only Leyland Olympian to receive a Palatine II body, as well as further examples on the Volvo Olympian and Dennis Arrow chassis. CentreWest Buses purchased 15 Palatine IIs on Volvo Olympian chassis for the 607 Express in 1996, while the Cowie Group purchased 13 Palatines IIs on the DAF DB250 chassis in January 1996, with an additional two being acquired from dealer stock in 1999, by which point Cowie London had become Arriva London. Additional Palatine IIs were purchased by London General, who purchased only 27 of the type, Armchair Passenger Transport, Harris Bus and London Suburban.

Other operators of the Palatine II on the Volvo Olympian chassis include Go North East, who purchased a total of 23 in 1997; Northumbria Motor Services, who took eight in 1994; East Yorkshire Motor Services, who took six in 1995, and Eastbourne Buses, who purchased the first Palatine II bodied on the DAF chassis.

Gallery

References

External links

Double-decker buses
Open-top buses
Palatine
Tri-axle buses
Vehicles introduced in 1988